Amin Ghaziani is a sociologist and author who is professor of sociology and Canada Research Chair in urban sexualities at University of British Columbia. Ghaziani has been awarded fellowships by the Princeton Society of Fellows in Liberal Arts and the Netherlands Institute for Advanced Study.

Early life and education
Ghaziani was born in Karachi, but relocated to Chicago along with his family.
He earned a BA in Sociology from the University of Michigan, during his junior year, he organized a "Queer Kiss In" event which sparked a legal dispute with the university. He completed his PhD from Northwestern University in 2002.

Career & research
In 2008, Ghaziani published his book  The dividends of dissent : how conflict and culture work in lesbian and gay marches on Washington, he explained LGBT organizing in the United States for four national-level marches between 1979 and 2000.
For this book, he was the finalist for Lambda Literary Award for LGBT Studies

Ghaziani research that a new form of discrimination has emerged in the West, which he calls performative progressiveness,through his interviews, Ghaziani found that some straight people perceive themselves as "gay-blind           and expect LGBTQ+ people to conform to heteronormative values, which he views as aggressive assimilation rather than true acceptance.
In 2014, Ghaziani's book "There Goes the Gayborhood?" he explores the changing dynamics of LGBT enclaves in major cities, particularly in Chicago. 
Through his research, Ghaziani discovered that the number of LGBT individuals living in traditional gay neighborhoods is decreasing, and new clusters are emerging in other neighborhoods and suburbs.

In 2019, he conducted a  research about members of the LGBTQ community diversification heterosexual neighborhoods, which shows that only 12% of LGBTQ adults live in gaybourhoods, while 72% have never lived in one.
Ghaziani found that LGBTQ individuals are creating "cultural archipelagos" outside of traditional gaybourhoods, particularly among LGBTQ people of color.

Selected publications

Bibliography

References

Living people
American sociologists
Academic staff of the University of British Columbia
Northwestern University alumni
University of Michigan alumni
Gay academics
American gay writers